Second window may refer to:

broadcast syndication rights for a work following the expiration of first window rights for that work
the inter-partes review period for third-party challenge and opposition of a granted patent or trademark
a wavelength band or transmission window in fibre-optic communications
the period of ischemic preconditioning, starting 24 hours after a coronary occlusion and lasting up to 72 hours, that can limit injuries of a subsequent ischaemia reperfusion in the myocardium

See also
Second Window, Second Floor, a song by Clyde McPhatter
First window (disambiguation)
Window (disambiguation)
Windowing (disambiguation)
Windows (disambiguation)